No More Glory is the debut solo studio album by American rapper MJG. The album was released on November 18, 1997, by Draper Inc. Records. The album's title is a reference to the confederate flag and its nickname "Glory".  MJG had already released three albums as a part of the group 8Ball & MJG, but following 1995's On Top of the World, the two rappers decided to each release a solo album before continuing as a group.  This was the first solo released from the group, 8Ball would release his solo debut, Lost, in 1998.  It would be MJG's only solo album until 2008 when he released Pimp Tight.

Track listing

"Take No Shit" is censored on all pressings.

Charts

Weekly charts

Year-end charts

References

8Ball & MJG albums
1997 albums